Prudishnaya is a rural locality (a village) in Niginskoye Rural Settlement, Nikolsky District, Vologda Oblast, Russia. The population was 17 as of 2002.

Geography 
Prudishnaya is located 23 km northwest of Nikolsk (the district's administrative centre) by road. Levkin is the nearest rural locality.

References 

Rural localities in Nikolsky District, Vologda Oblast